Powered paragliding, also known as paramotoring or PPG, is a form of ultralight aviation where the pilot wears a back-pack motor (a paramotor) which provides enough thrust to take off using a paraglider. It can be launched in still air, and on level ground, by the pilot alone — no assistance is required.

In many countries, including the United States, powered paragliding is minimally regulated and requires no license.  The ability to fly both low and slow safely, the "open" feel, the minimal equipment and maintenance costs, and the portability are claimed to be this type of flying's greatest merits.

Due to the paramotor's slow forward speed and nature of a soft wing, it is risky to operate in high winds, turbulence, or intense thermal activity, especially for inexperienced pilots.

After a brief run (typically ) the wing lifts the motor and its harnessed pilot off the ground. After takeoff, the pilot gets into the seat and sits suspended beneath the inflated paraglider wing like a pendulum. Control is available using right and left brake toggles and a hand-held throttle control for the motor and propeller speed. Some rigs are equipped with trimmers and speed bar to adjust angle of incidence, which also changes the angle of attack for increased or reduced speed. Brake toggles and weight shift is the general method for controlling yaw and roll (turning). Tip brakes and stabilo steering (if equipped) will also affect yaw and roll, and they may be used for more efficient flying or when required by the wing manufacturer in certain wing configurations such as reflex. The throttle controls pitch (along with speed bar and trimmers). Unlike regular aircraft, increasing throttle causes a pitch-up and climb (or reduced descent) but does  increase airspeed.

Uses 
Paragliders are usually used for personal recreation, with some exceptions.

Military 
Powered paragliding has seen some military application including insertion of special forces soldiers and also border patrol in some governments.  The Lebanese Airborne regiment adopted this technique in 2008.  The US Army and Egyptian Army have used Paramotor Inc FX series units for many years, and these units are still under production.

Civilian 
Because of limiting weather requirements, powered paragliders are not reliable replacements for most aviation uses.

They have been used for search and rescue, herding of animals, photography, surveying, and other uses but regulations in most countries limit commercial activities.

Safety and regulations 
Research estimates that the activity is slightly safer (per event) than riding motorcycles and more dangerous than riding in cars. The most likely cause of serious injury is body contact with a spinning propeller. The next most likely cause of injury is flying into something other than the landing zone. Some countries run detailed statistics on accidents, e.g., in Germany in 2018 about 36,000 paragliding pilots registered 232 accidents, where 109 caused serious injury and 9 were fatal.

With enough height over ground, many potential issues with the canopy can be resolved without applying the reserve parachute. The required skills can be acquired in SIV trainings, which improve the overall safety of flying by providing a better understanding on the system limitations and practical training of extreme situations.

The lack of established design criteria for these aircraft led the British Air Accidents Investigation Branch to conclude in 2007 that "only when precise reserve factors have been established for individual harness/wing combinations carrying realistic suspended masses, at load factors appropriate to the maneuvers to be carried out, can these aircraft be considered to be structurally safe".

License and training 
Neither a license nor specific training is required in the U.S., U.K. or many other countries. Where there is no specific regulation (e.g., Mexico), paramotor flying is tolerated provided the pilots cooperate with local officials when appropriate. In countries where specific regulation exists, such as Canada, France, Italy, and South Africa, pilots must be trained, both in flying theory and practice, by licensed instructors. Some countries that require formal certification frequently do so through non-government ultralight aviation organizations.

Regardless of regulations, powered paragliding can be dangerous when practiced without proper training.

For a pilot to get through most organizations' full pilot syllabus requires between 5 and 15 days which, due to weather, may include far more calendar time. A number of techniques are employed for teaching, although most include getting the student familiar with handling the wing either on the ground, via towing, small hills, or on tandem flights.

With special gear, it is possible to take a passenger (tandem), but most countries, including the U.S., require some form of certification to do so.

Regulations 
In most countries, paramotor pilots operate under simple rules that spare them certification requirements for pilot and gear. Those laws, however, limit where they can fly—specifying that pilots avoid areas of urban/suburban population and larger airports to minimize risk to other people or aircraft. U.S. pilots operate under Federal Aviation Administration regulation Part 103. As powered heavier-than-air flying vehicles with wings, paramotors are technically a type of airplane, but in legal circles they are not typically classified as such.

In the United Kingdom, paramotors are regulated by the Civil Aviation Authority, are classified as self-propelled hang-gliders, and can be flown without registration or a license as long as they weigh less than 70 kg, have a stall speed not exceeding 35 knots, and are foot-launched.  Wheel-launched paramotors are allowed under the additional conditions that they do not carry passengers, and have a stall speed of 20 knots or less, but may weigh up to 75 kg if they carry a reserve parachute.

Associations 
In the U.S., the sport is represented primarily by the US Powered Paragliding Association (USPPA) which also holds an exemption allowing two-place training by appropriately certified tandem instructors. The US Ultralight Association (USUA) and Aero Sports Connections (ASC) also offer some support.

Instructors in the U.S. are primarily represented and certified by the United States Powered Paragliding Association (USPPA).

In the United Kingdom, the sport is represented by the British Hang Gliding and Paragliding Association.

Wheeled Launch - Trikes & Quads 

Lightweight carts or "trikes" (called "quads" if they have four wheels) can also be attached to paramotors for those who prefer or are unable to foot launch. Some wheeled units are permanently attached to the paramotor.

In the United States, if the aircraft meets the ultralight definitions as defined in Part 103, no license is required, and single occupancy is the only option without special permission. In order to launch a tandem setup, the pilot would need to receive an FAA exception to Part 103.1.a. through one of the associations noted above.

In the UK, trike-mounted paramotors are still classified as "self-propelled hang-gliders" if the "performance of the aircraft remains equivalent to one that can be foot-launched." However, if the machine has two seats, it is no longer an ultralight.

Powered Parachute Differences 
A powered paraglider (PPG) differs from a powered parachute (PPC) primarily in size, power, control method, and number of occupants. Powered paragliders are smaller, use more efficient (but more difficult to manage) paraglider wings, and steer with brake toggles like sport parachutists.  Powered parachutes typically use easier-to-manage but less efficient wings, have larger engines, are steered by foot and may be able to take along passengers. There are exceptions; a growing number of powered parachutes use elliptical wings, some use hand controls, and many are light, single-seat aircraft that meet FAA Part 103 requirements.

World records 
Determined by the FAI, RPF1 category.

 The current world altitude record for powered paragliders (RPF1TM) is 7,589m (24 898 ft). It was set by Ramon Morillas Salmeron (Granada, Spain) on 19 September 2009 while flying an Advance Sigma paraglider and a PAP frame powered by a HE R220Duo engine.
 A highly publicized altitude record attempt was made by Bear Grylls on 14 May 2007 at 0933 local time over the Himalayas using a Parajet engine invented by Gilo Cardozo and a specifically designed reflex paraglider wing invented by Mike Campbell-Jones of Paramania. Cardozo, who also flew in the attempt, had engine problems that ended his climb 300m short of the record. Grylls went on to claim an altitude of 8,990 m (29,494 ft), though satisfactory evidence of this claim was not submitted to FAI, and therefore it was not ratified as a world record for this aircraft class.
 Distance in a straight line without landing:  set on 23 April 2007 by Ramon Morillas Salmeron flying from Jerez de la Frontera, Cádiz (Spain) to Lanzarote, Canary Islands (Spain) with an Advance Omega 7 paraglider.
Fastest Crossing of the United States of America Direct Path 2104 Miles in December 2020.  Harley Milne (50xChallenge) cross the southern route from San Diego to Jacksonville Florida in 8 days 2 hours.  Flying 48 hours 19 minutes, over 22 flights with a maximum 12,444 AGL and Max Speed of 89.9 MPH ground speed. 

Determined by Guinness World Records 

The longest journey by powered paraglider is 9,132 km (5,674.35 mi) and was achieved by Miroslav Oros (Czech Republic), flying throughout the Czech Republic, starting in Sazená and ending in Lipovå-lázn, between 1 April 2011 and 30 June 2011.
2nd Longest Journey by Powered Paraglider:  set on 24 August 2009  by Canadian photographer and documentary filmmaker Benjamin Jordan during his Above + Beyond Canada campaign. In an unprecedented flight between Tofino, BC and Bay Saint Lawrence, NS, the cross-Canada campaign involved 108 flights with landings at schools and youth summer camps along the way. Jordan provided youth with motivational speeches and arranged them in shapes on the ground before launching and continuing on the next leg of his journey. Funds raised over the course of the trip were donated to various charities across Canada to help children from low-income homes attend summer camp.
First Paramotor Pilot to Fly in all 50 US States.  The fastest time to fly a paramotor/ powered paraglider in all 50 US states is 215 days and was achieved by Harley Milne (USA), across USA from 8 November 2019 to 10 June 2020. While achieving this record Harley is also the first to complete this undertaking.

Images

See also 
 Fan Man
 Hang gliding
 Jet pack: flying with a parafoil and a jetpack
 Kite
 Paramotor
 Powered hang glider
 Powered parachute
 Powered skydiving, where the participant jumps out of an aircraft
 Ultralight trike
 USPPA

Notes

References

External links 

Paramotor Club
United States Powered Paragliding Association (USPPA)
Aero Sports Connection - dedicated to handling operational information, such as forms and requirements for qualifying
PPG videos
Foot Flyer - powered paragliding information/reviews
Parabatix Sky Racers - a competition / show-based event

Air sports
Paragliding
Ultralight aircraft
Parachuting
Aircraft engines
Paramotors